Dabouyo (also spelled Dagbaro) is a town in south-western Ivory Coast. It is a sub-prefecture of Guéyo Department in Nawa Region, Bas-Sassandra District.

Dabouyo was a commune until March 2012, when it became one of 1126 communes nationwide that were abolished.

In 2021, the population of the sub-prefecture of Dabouyo was 45,751.

Villages
The ten villages of the sub-prefecture of Dabouyo and their population in 2014 are:

References

Sub-prefectures of Nawa Region
Former communes of Ivory Coast